The 2021–22 Men's Belgian Hockey League was the 102nd season of the Men's Belgian Hockey League, the top men's Belgian field hockey league.

The season started on 5 September 2021 and concluded on 8 May 2022 with the second match of the championship final. Dragons were the defending champions. Racing won their sixth league title by defeating Gantoise 5–4 on aggregate in the championship final.

Changes from 2020–21
This season was played with 12 instead of 14 teams again. Each team played each other twice and the top four teams advanced to the championship play-offs. The bottom two teams were relegated directly and the team in 10th place played a relegation play-off against the third placed team from the second division.

Teams

Number of teams by provinces

Regular season

Standings

Results

Play-offs

Bracket

Semi-finals

5–5 on aggregate. Gantoise won the shoot-out 5–4.

Racing won 4–3 on aggregate.

Third place game

Final

Racing won 5–4 on aggregate and won their sixth league title.

Relegation play-offs

Overview

|}

Matches

Léopold won 12–3 on aggregate, and therefore both clubs remained in their respective leagues.

Top goalscorers

See also
 2021–22 Women's Belgian Hockey League

References

Men's Belgian Hockey League
Belgian Hockey League
Hockey League
Hockey League